Baschurch is a large village and civil parish in Shropshire, England.

It lies in North Shropshire, north-west of Shrewsbury. The village has a population of 2,503 as of the 2011 census. The village has strong links to Shrewsbury to the south-east, Oswestry to the north-west, and Wem to the north-east. There is a large village not far west of Baschurch called Ruyton-XI-Towns.

History
The earliest references to Baschurch are under its Welsh name Eglwyssau Bassa (Churches of Bassa), in a seven-stanza englyn-poem of the same name found in the Welsh cycle of poems called Canu Heledd, generally thought to date to the ninth century:<ref>Jenny Rowland, Early Welsh Saga Poetry: A Study and Edition of the ‘Englynion''' (Cambridge: Brewer, 1990), p. 389 for dating, pp. 435-36 for edition, p. 487 for translation [stanzas 45-51].</ref>

The English name Baschurch first appears in the Domesday Book of 1086 as Bascherche, and both names may derive from an Anglo-Saxon personal name Bass(a). Thus the name in Canu Heledd is a Brittonic version of an English name.

Local tradition holds that the Berth Pool and its ancient earthworks outside the village are the resting place of the legendary King Arthur.

In medieval times, several properties in the parish, including Adcote Mill, were owned by Haughmond Abbey near Shrewsbury.

Baschurch had a township called Boreatton, or Bratton, standing on the banks of the River Perry, with a country house called Bratton House.

The world's first orthopaedic hospital was established at Florence House in Baschurch by Sir Robert Jones and Dame Agnes Hunt in 1900 as a convalescent home for crippled children and later to treat wounded from the First World War. The hospital moved to Oswestry in 1921.

In 2000 a large stone made of local sandstone was erected in the modern centre of the village to commemorate the Millennium. Similar smaller stones were erected in neighbouring communities.

Churches
A major feature of the village is All Saints' Church (Church of England) which is one of the oldest standing structures in the village (perhaps the oldest). A timber church which burnt down is believed to have stood on the same site previously. Leading industrialist and builder Thomas Telford made numerous major alterations to the modern sandstone church.

The village also had a Methodist chapel which was built in 1873 and closed in 2014 after the congregation had "dwindled to less than a dozen". It was sold for conversion into a house in April 2015.

 Twin town 
Baschurch is twinned with the town of Giat in the French département of  Puy-de-Dôme, in the Auvergne-Rhône-Alpes région''.

Education
The village has two schools including Baschurch Church of England Primary School, and the Corbet School formerly known as Baschurch Secondary Modern School. Just outside the village is Walford College, an agricultural and sports college which in 2002 merged with Oswestry-based North Shropshire College to form Walford and North Shropshire College.

Amenities
Baschurch has a number of amenities including a post office, a retained Shropshire Fire and Rescue Service fire station and a village hall located on Eyton Lane next to the Corbet School.

Railways
The Shrewsbury to Chester Line passes through the village, though the Victorian railway station was closed to passengers in 1960 and goods trains in 1965.

On 13 February 1961 a passenger train travelling from Shrewsbury to Chester collided with a goods train which was partially shunted into a siding in Baschurch. Three people died in the accident. Television footage of the wreckage is available from the BBC.

There have been repeated efforts to bring the railway station back into use, most recently in autumn 2008, with the support of Baschurch Parish Council and the Shrewsbury-Chester Rail Users' Association. In September 2009, a public meeting organised by the Baschurch Station Group, was attended by 250 local people and received extensive media coverage.

Notable people 
 Edward Lawrence (1623-1695) was Vicar of Baschurch from 1648 until ejected as a nonconformist in 1662 and continued to live in the parish until 1666.
 Henry David Leslie (1822–1896 in Baschurch) an English composer and conductor, supported amateur choral musicians.
 Henry Eckford (1823-1905) cultivator of sweet peas, was gardener at home of Dr Sankey of Boreatton in the parish before moving to Wem in 1888.
 George Robert Jebb (1838 in Baschurch–1927) a civil engineer, prominent in the field of railway and canal engineering.
 Alfred Payne (1849-1927), cricketer, lived at Walford Manor in the parish, in 1907.
 William Bebbington (1856 in Baschurch–1939) a cheese maker and member of the Queensland Legislative Assembly.
 Rowland Hunt (1858-1943), was Lord of the Manor of Baschurch, seated at Boreatton Hall, and Conservative politician.
 Dame Agnes Hunt DBE RRC (1866–1948 in Baschurch) sister of above, a British nurse, recognised as the first orthopaedic nurse
Dave Pountney (1939 in Baschurch - ) professional footballer for Shrewsbury Town, Aston Villa and Chester City.

Broadband internet
Baschurch was one of just six places in the United Kingdom to succeed in a competition held by BT to get super-fast broadband. The winners of the "Race to Infinity" competition were announced on 6 January 2011 and Baschurch came sixth. BT originally promised that only the top 5 places would go through with the upgrade (involving optic fibre-based infrastructure), but were impressed enough by the response in Baschurch. As of March 2018 much of the village has yet to be connected to super-fast broadband.

See also
Listed buildings in Baschurch

References

External links

 

Villages in Shropshire
Civil parishes in Shropshire